Pedro Vitor Ferreira da Silva, known as Pedro Vitor (born 20 March 1998) is a Brazilian football player who plays for Náutico.

Honours

Sport
 Campeonato Pernambucano: 2017

 Náutico
 Campeonato Pernambucano: 2022

Club career
He made his Campeonato Pernambucano debut for Sport Recife on 3 April 2017 in a game against Salgueiro.

References

External links
 

1998 births
Sportspeople from Alagoas
Living people
Brazilian footballers
Association football midfielders
Sport Club do Recife players
Aris Thessaloniki F.C. players
FC Lviv players
Kuopion Palloseura players
Campeonato Pernambucano players
Ukrainian Premier League players
Brazilian expatriate footballers
Expatriate footballers in Greece
Brazilian expatriate sportspeople in Greece
Expatriate footballers in Ukraine
Brazilian expatriate sportspeople in Ukraine
Expatriate footballers in Finland
Brazilian expatriate sportspeople in Finland
Azuriz Futebol Clube players